Cymindis discoidea is a species of ground beetle in the subfamily Harpalinae. It was described by Pierre François Marie Auguste Dejean in 1824.

References

discoidea
Beetles described in 1824